Mount Howitt, also known as Toot-buck-nulluck in the Gunai language, is a mountain in Victoria, Australia, named for Alfred William Howitt.  Located in the Wonangatta Moroka Unit of the Alpine National Park approximately 170 km north-east of Melbourne.

The mountain is a popular bushwalking destination due to its views and relatively easy access in summer via several trails, including the Australian Alps Walking Track. The closest point to a road is via MacAlister Springs and the Howitt Plains, a distance of about seven kilometres. There is also a longer and more difficult hike up the West Spur. It climbs from the Howqua River, which is generally accessed via Mount Stirling.

Vegetation

The mountain is surrounded by deep valleys, where riparian forests of Manna Gum dominate. At higher altitudes, Mountain Gum - Snow Gum forests begin to dominate and they grow on sheltered sites between 1,000 and 1,400 metres with a grassy or heathy understorey. Above this, the summit itself is above treeline.

History

Aboriginal people used the King and Howqua areas as major trade routes across the Great Dividing Range, including Mount Howitt itself. They also had several quarries in the area that yielded the hard greenstone which was highly valued for tools and weapons.
European settlement began in the 1840s, when grazing commenced, followed by the discovery of gold in the Howqua Valley in the 1860s.

Shelters and alpine huts
The closest shelter to Mount Howitt is the Vallejo Gantner Hut at Macalister Springs. Here there is also a reliable water source provided by a spring water pipe which flows throughout the year, even during drought. In the summer of 2013/2014 a new toilet was built at Macalister Springs with southern facing views. The toilet is a drop toilet with waste being helicoptered out when full.

In popular culture
The area around Mount Howitt is a setting for the Tomorrow series of books by John Marsden. In these books he changes the name of the nearby Cross Cut Saw to Tailor's Stitch, and the Devils Staircase to Satan's Steps.

The Man from Snowy River is one of Australia's most famous poems written by Andrew Barton (Banjo) Paterson and while the character of 'The Man' is generally believed to be based on Jack Riley from Corryong in the Upper Murray River, the film of the same name  was filmed in the area around Mount Howitt. Perhaps most prominent of the locations that appears in the film is at Hells Window, on Mount Magdala, which is connected to Mount Howitt via Big Hill.

See also

 Australian Alps
 Alpine National Park
 List of mountains in Victoria
 Wonnangatta murders

References

External links 

Howitt
Alpine National Park